Neyg (also Romanized as Neyg and Nāīg) is a village in Ali Jamal Rural District, in the Central District of Boshruyeh County, South Khorasan Province, Iran. At the 2006 census, its population was 14, in 9 families.

References 

Populated places in Boshruyeh County